FFQ may refer to:

 Fédération des femmes du Québec
 Food frequency questionnaire

FFQ là đội tuyển liên minh huyền thoại thuộc sở hữu của CEO  Sai và QTV